Kim Hyung-yul (born 20 February 1964) is a South Korean football manager.

Career
Kim appointed as manager of FC Anyang before 2019 season starts.

References

1964 births
Living people
South Korean football managers
FC Anyang managers
K League 2 managers
Kookmin University alumni